Sandown is a town in Rockingham County, New Hampshire, United States. The population was 6,548 at the 2020 census, up from 5,986 at the 2010 census.

History 

Once part of Kingston, Sandown was incorporated as a separate town in 1756 by colonial governor Benning Wentworth. It was named for picturesque Sandown on the Isle of Wight. The first minister of Sandown, the Reverend Josiah Cotton, built the Sandown Meeting House in 1774. It had an  pulpit and marble columns supporting the gallery, and is still an excellent example of early New England church architecture.

Geography
Sandown is primarily drained by the Exeter River, part of the Great Bay/Piscataqua River watershed. Phillips Pond, south of the center of town, and Showell Pond, a smaller water body, drain north to the Exeter. Angle Pond, in the southeast corner of the town, and Cub Pond, along Sandown's eastern border, drain east towards the Powwow River and are part of the Merrimack River watershed.

Adjacent municipalities
 Fremont, New Hampshire (northeast)
 Danville, New Hampshire (east)
 Hampstead, New Hampshire (south)
 Derry, New Hampshire (southwest)
 Chester, New Hampshire (northwest)

Demographics

As of the census of 2000, there were 5,143 people, 1,694 households, and 1,382 families residing in the town.  The population density was 369.8 people per square mile (142.8/km).  There were 1,777 housing units at an average density of 127.8 per square mile (49.3/km).  The racial makeup of the town was 98.43% White, 0.21% African American, 0.12% Native American, 0.16% Asian, 0.02% Pacific Islander, 0.37% from other races, and 0.70% from two or more races. Hispanic or Latino of any race were 0.56% of the population.

There were 1,694 households, out of which 48.7% had children under the age of 18 living with them, 71.0% were married couples living together, 6.8% had a female householder with no husband present, and 18.4% were non-families. 12.9% of all households were made up of individuals, and 3.1% had someone living alone who was 65 years of age or older.  The average household size was 3.02 and the average family size was 3.32.

In the town, the population was spread out, with 31.4% under the age of 18, 5.4% from 18 to 24, 37.1% from 25 to 44, 20.7% from 45 to 64, and 5.3% who were 65 years of age or older.  The median age was 35 years. For every 100 females, there were 105.1 males.  For every 100 females age 18 and over, there were 100.5 males.

The median income for a household in the town was $67,581, and the median income for a family was $73,083. Males had a median income of $49,012 versus $29,773 for females. The per capita income for the town was $25,978.  About 3.3% of families and 4.1% of the population were below the poverty line, including 2.8% of those under age 18 and 9.2% of those age 65 or over.

Education 

 Timberlane Regional High School, Grades 9–12, located in Plaistow
 Timberlane Regional Middle School, Grades 6–8, located in Plaistow
 Sandown North Elementary School, Grades 1–5, located in Sandown
 Sandown Central School, Grades Pre-K, located in Sandown

Transportation 
Two New Hampshire state routes cross Sandown.

NH 121 crosses the extreme southwestern corner of town, running from Chester (via a small corner of Derry) to Hampstead.
NH 121A is the main road through the center of town, running from Chester in the west to the village of East Hampstead in the southeast. It is locally known as Main Street.

References

External links
 
 Tri-Town Times, community news
 Sandown Public Library
 Sandown Historical Society & Depot Museum
 New Hampshire Economic and Labor Market Information Bureau Profile

 
Towns in Rockingham County, New Hampshire
Towns in New Hampshire